Dendropsophus amicorum is a species of frogs in the family Hylidae.

It is endemic to Venezuela. Its natural habitat is subtropical or tropical moist montane forests. It is threatened by habitat loss.

Sources

amicorum
Amphibians described in 1998
Taxonomy articles created by Polbot